Matale Hindu College is a national boy school which is located in the Central province of Sri Lanka (Mandandawela, Matale).

References 

Boys' schools in Sri Lanka
Former Hindu schools in Sri Lanka
National schools in Sri Lanka
Schools in Matale